The Canadian Business Hall of Fame celebrates the outstanding achievements of Canada's most distinguished business leaders, past and present. Over 170 Order of the Business Hall of Fame Companions serve as inspiring examples for all young Canadians and are featured in a display in the Allen Lambert Galleria located at Brookfield Place in Toronto, Ontario.  Companions are selected by an independent panel representing Canadian business, academic and media institutions.

The Canadian Business Hall of Fame was established by Junior Achievement of Canada in 1979.

Companions of the Canadian Business Hall of Fame

Job Abbott
W. Maxwell "Max" Aitken
Charles Allard
Israel H. Asper
Joseph E. Atkinson
A. Charles Baillie
St. Clair Balfour
Jim Balsillie
Irving K. Barber
John W.H. Bassett
Sonja I. Bata
Thomas J. Bata
Laurent Beaudoin
Adam Beck
Clive Beddoe
Michel Bélanger
Max Bell
Aldo Bensadoun
Charles Bentall
L.L.G. (Poldi) Bentley
Alfred J. Billes
J. William Billes
Henry Birks
Conrad Black
J. Armand Bombardier
Edmund C. Bovey
John L. Bragg
Jeffry Hall Brock
Samuel Bronfman
Peter M. Brown
Patrick Burns
André Chagnon
John Edward Cleghorn
John Clyne
Jack L. Cockwell
Albert D. Cohen
George A. Cohon
Jack Cooper
Jean Coutu
George Albertus Cox
Purdy Crawford
John Chalker Crosbie
David M. Culver
Samuel Cunard
Richard J. Currie
Camille A. Dagenais
Sir Graham Day
Nan-b de Gaspé Beaubien
Philippe de Gaspé Beaubien
A. Jean de Grandpré
Alphonse Desjardins
A. Ephraim Diamond
David Dunkelman
James Hamet Dunn
Timothy Eaton
John Robert Evans
Anthony S. Fell
Joseph Flavelle
Charles Frosst
Arthur D. Ganong
Peter E. Gilgan
Serge Godin
Peter Godsoe
George Gooderham
Donald Gordon
James K. Gray
Ian Greenberg
Frank Griffiths
Charles L. Gundy
Richard Haskayne
Gerald R. Heffernan
Herbert Samuel Holt
C.D. Howe
Arthur Irving
James K. Irving
John E. Irving
K.C. Irving
Hal Jackman
Stephen A. Jarislowsky
Roy Jodrey
Ron Joyce
Dr. Norman B. Keevil
Izaak Walton Killam
Leon Koerner
Murray Koffler
Edouard Lacroix
Guy Laliberté
Jacques Lamarre
Allen T. Lambert
Mike Lazaridis
Monique F. Leroux
Pierre H. Lessard
Jean-Louis Lévesque
Theodore Loblaw
Brandt Louie
Tong Louie
John Bayne Maclean
H.R. MacMillan
Frederick C. Mannix
Hart Massey
Joseph Masson
John Robert (Bud) McCaig
Wallace McCain
Harrison McCain
Grant McConachie
Gordon Roy McGregor
R. S. McLaughlin
Frank M. McMahon
William M. Mercer
David Mirvish
Ed Mirvish
John Molson
Samuel J. Moore
Peter Munk
William Neilson
A. Deane Nesbitt
Ted Newall
David P. O'Brien
Paul Paré
Jim Pattison
Edson Loy Pease
Pierre Péladeau
Henri Perron
Jean-Marie Poitras
Alfred Powis
David H. Race
James Armstrong Richardson
Muriel S. Richardson
Cedric E. Ritchie
Edward Samuel "Ted" Rogers
Jean-Baptiste Rolland
Stephen Boleslav Roman
Phillip S. Ross
John Roth
Joseph L. Rotman
Kenneth C. Rowe
Thomas A. Russell
Guy Saint-Pierre
Emanuele (Lino) Saputo
John M. Schneider
Seymour Schulich
Gerald W. Schwartz
Robert Scrivener
Joseph Segal
Joseph Shannon
Isadore Sharp
JR Shaw
Frank H. Sherman
Clifford Sifton
George Simpson
Ian David Sinclair
Donald A. Smith
Donald J. Smith
David F. Sobey
Donald C.R. Sobey
Frank H. Sobey
William Southam
Ronald D. Southern
T. A. St-Germain
Sam Steinberg
Frank Stronach
Allan R. Taylor
E. P. Taylor
J. Allyn Taylor
Paul M. Tellier
Roy H. Thomson
Ted Tilden
Walter B. Tilden
Noah Timmins
Antoine Turnel
Joseph Vachon
William Cornelius Van Horne
Max Ward
R. Howard Webster
W. Galen Weston
W. Garfield Weston
L.R. Wilson
Ray D. Wolfe
Geoffrey H. Wood
Charles Woodward
Stephen J. R. Smith

See also
2012 in Canadian business

References

External links
Official site

1979 establishments in Ontario
Halls of fame in Canada
Businesspeople halls of fame
Junior Achievement